"Ti Amo" is a song recorded by Australian singer Gina G, released in May 1997 as the fourth single from her debut album, Fresh! (1997). Written by her with Mark Taylor and Paul Barry, it is a flamenco-flavoured story of a holiday romance. It was a number-one hit in Romania and a top 10 hit in Finland, Scotland and Israel. In the UK, it peaked at number 11 and was the first single by her to not reach the UK top 10. Gina G performed the song in the British music chart television programme Top of the Pops.

Composition
The song moved away from Gina G.'s previous, fast-paced Eurodance songs and has a sultry, sensual mid-tempo that allows the singer to fully immerse herself into character and tell the tale of a torrid summer romance. It arrived well ahead of the Latin-pop phenomenon that swept the charts in the late ‘90s and features influences like a Flamenco guitar. The song runs 2 minutes and 53 seconds long with a F# Minor key and 100bpm.

Critical reception
Larry Flick from Billboard wrote, ""Ti Amo" has already scored as a huge hit in Europe and has been getting active play there since last summer—playing at every disco, on every car stereo, and in every home. It's been blasting many away by its exquisite dance beat and Gina G.'s sweetly tuneful voice. The nostalgic lyrics magnetically urge many listeners to long for one more "lazy summer day in the sun." The wonderfully rhythmic drums, melancholic guitars, and background chorus (emphasized by the use of both Italian and English) make "Ti Amo" a pleasure to listen to. It's a single with the potential to blow away the U.S. market." 

Can't Stop the Pop said it is "essentially the love-child" of Madonna’s "La Isla Bonita" and Ace of Base’s "All That She Wants", adding that it "was the boldest attempt yet to show that Gina G could do more than giddy Eurodance." A reviewer from L.A. Weekly noted "the flamencofied guitars and castanets [which are] creating a storm-cloud-tinged Mediterranean-island-at-midnight undercurrent". Larry Printz from The Morning Call viewed it as "ABBA-esque". Music Week rated "Ti Amo" four out of five, adding that here, "flamenco guitar meets reggae lite with Gina's seductive vocals on top." Mark Beaumont from NME opined that it "wants to be 'La Isla Bonita' so much its maracas practically explode." Also Pop Rescue commented that "it feels almost like it tries to nod back" to the song by Madonna, complimenting it as a "nice summery" track. John Everson from SouthtownStar described it as "a chugging amalgamation of synth rhythms and Spanish guitars, [where] she sings of lusty memories". Chris Dickinson from St. Louis Post-Dispatch wrote that "Ti Amo" "sounds like Madonna in Latino-disco mode".

Chart performance
"Ti Amo" was a notable hit on several charts, peaking at number-one in Romania. In the United Kingdom, it was Gina's first release to miss the top 10, entering at number 11 on the UK Singles Chart, on June 1, 1997. The single spent five weeks in the UK top 75. In Finland and Scotland, it was a top 10 hit, peaking at number seven and nine. And in Lithuania, it reached the top 20. On the Eurochart Hot 100, the song reached its highest position as number 47. Outside Europe, "Ti Amo" was a big hit in Israel, peaking at number eight. It did also chart in Australia, where it reached only number 113. Unlike "Ooh Aah... Just a Little Bit" and "Gimme Some Love", the song didn't chart in the US.

Music video
A music video was produced to promote the single, directed by Swedish-based director Matt Broadley.

In the video, Gina G. plays the trophy wife of a mafia boss. She is locked up in her room, unhappy with her life and sitting in front of the mirror. She manages to run away and rides on a white horse to her secret lover. Her man are following her, but loses sight of her. We see Gina G. meeting her hot latino lover. They dance tango by a burning fire and are embracing each other. An old man have seen her ride by his house, but when the mafia boss and his men asks if he has seen her, the old man is pretending he has not seen her. At the end of the vide Gina G. leaves her lover and returns home. She sneaks into her room before her husband finds her lying on her bed.

Track listings

 12", Germany (0630-19845-0)
"Ti Amo" (Metro's "Summer Of Love" Mix) — 5:51
"Ti Amo" (Basstown Flamenco Euro Mix) — 3:31
"Ti Amo" (The Handbaggers Mix) — 7:22
"Ti Amo" (Andy & The Lampboy Mastermix) — 6:41
"Ti Amo" (Bluehead Special Mix) — 6:41

 CD single CD1, Europe (WEA107CD1)
"Ti Amo" (Metro Radio Version) — 2:52
"Ti Amo" (Metro Extended Mix) — 4:21
"Ti Amo" (Bayside Boys Club Mix) — 5:34
"Ti Amo" (Metro's 'Summer Of Love' Club Mix) — 5:51
"Ti Amo" (Basstown Vocal Club Mix) — 5:18
"Ti Amo" (Basstown Euro Flamenco Mix) — 3:31
"Ti Amo" (Handbaggers Mix) — 7:22

 CD single CD2, Europe (WEA107CD2)
"Ti Amo" (Trouser Enthusiasts' Schoolboy Crush Mix) — 10:05
"Ti Amo" (Phat 'N' Phunky Club Mix) — 9:04
"Ti Amo" (Red Hand Gang Dub) — 7:20
"Ti Amo" (Andy And The Lamboy Mastermix) — 6:41
"Ti Amo" (Bluehead Special Mix) — 6:40

 CD maxi, UK (WEA0107CD1)
"Ti Amo" (Metro Radio Version) — 2:52
"Ti Amo" (Metro Extended Mix) — 4:21
"Ti Amo" (Bayside Boys Club Mix) — 5:34
"Ti Amo" (Metro's 'Summer Of Love' Club Mix) — 5:51
"Ti Amo" (Basstown Vocal Club Mix) — 5:18
"Ti Amo" (Basstown Euro Flamenco Mix) — 3:31
"Ti Amo" (Handbaggers Mix) — 7:22

 CD maxi, UK (WEA107CD2)
"Ti Amo" (Trouser Enthusiasts' Schoolboy Crush Mix) — 10:05
"Ti Amo" (Phat 'N' Phunky Club Mix) — 9:04
"Ti Amo" (Red Hand Gang Dub) — 7:20
"Ti Amo" (Andy And The Lamboy Mastermix) — 6:41
"Ti Amo" (Bluehead Special Mix) — 6:40

Other versions:
"Ti Amo" (Andy & The Lamboy Dub Mix) (6:09) - from the UK promotional 12"
"Ti Amo" (Andy & The Lamboy Strip Dub Mix) (6:09) - from the UK promotional 12"

Charts

References

1997 songs
1997 singles
Gina G songs
Warner Records singles
Number-one singles in Romania
Songs written by Paul Barry (songwriter)
Songs written by Mark Taylor (record producer)
Music videos directed by Matt Broadley